The 2023 Oregon State Beavers softball team represents Oregon State University in the 2023 NCAA Division I softball season as members of the Pac-12 Conference. The Beavers are led by head coach Laura Berg in her eleventh season and play their home games at Kelly Field.

Preseason 
Following the Beavers second Women's College World Series appearance they entered the 2023 season ranked in the Top-25 preseason polls by Softball America and USA Softball. Assistant coach Eric Leyba was promoted to Associate Head Coach and Jamie Wiggins joined the coaching staff.

Roster

Schedule and results

! style=""| Regular season
|- valign="top"

|-bgcolor=bbffbb
| Feb 10 || vs. * || No. 19 || Tiger Park • Baton Rouge, LA || 2–0 || Haendiges (1–0) || Linton (1–1) || None || 1–0 || 
|-bgcolor=ffbbbb
| Feb 11 || vs. New Mexico* || No. 19 || Tiger Park • Baton Rouge, LA || 0–8 || Brinka (1–0) || Garcia (0–1) || None || 1–1 || 
|-bgcolor=ffbbbb
| Feb 11 || at No. 25 * || No. 19 || Tiger Park • Baton Rouge, LA || 0–12 || Berzon (1–0) || Stepto (0–1) || None || 1–2 || 
|-bgcolor=bbffbb
| Feb 12 || vs. Nicholls* || No. 19 || Tiger Park • Baton Rouge, LA || 6–3 || Garcia (1–1) || Yoo (0–2) || Stepto (1) || 2–2 ||
|-bgcolor=ffbbbb
| Feb 12 || at No. 25 LSU* || No. 19 || Tiger Park • Baton Rouge, LA || 0–3 || Kilponen (2–0) || Haendiges (1–1) || None || 2–3 || 
|-bgcolor=bbffbb
| Feb 16 || vs. * ||  || Alberta B. Farrington Softball Stadium • Tempe, AZ || 1–0 || Haendiges (2–1) || Ross (1–2) || None || 3–3 ||
|-bgcolor=ffbbbb
| Feb 17 || vs. BYU* ||  || Alberta B. Farrington Softball Stadium • Tempe, AZ || 2–3 || Grey (3–2) || Haendiges (2–2) || None || 3–4 ||
|-bgcolor=ffbbbb
| Feb 18 || vs. * || || Alberta B. Farrington Softball Stadium • Tempe, AZ || 8–9 || Korth (3–1) || Stepto (0–2) || None || 3–5 || 
|-bgcolor=ffbbbb
| Feb 18 || vs. * || || Alberta B. Farrington Softball Stadium • Tempe, AZ || 0–3 || Johnson (3–2) || Garcia (1–2) || None || 3–6 ||
|-bgcolor=bbffbb
| Feb 19 || vs. * || || GCU Softball Stadium • Phoenix, AZ || 5–4 || Stepto (1–2) || Thompson (2–1) || None || 4–6 || 
|-bgcolor=bbffbb
| Feb 24 || vs. No. 24 * || || Big League Dreams Complex • Cathedral City, CA || 3–2 || Haendiges (3–2) || Pannell (0–1) || None || 5–6 || 
|-bgcolor=bbffbb
| Feb 24 || vs. * || || Big League Dreams Complex • Cathedral City, CA || 5–1 || Stepto (2–2) || Carranco (0–2) || Garcia (1) || 6–6 || 
|-bgcolor=ffbbbb
| Feb 25 || vs. * || || Big League Dreams Complex • Cathedral City, CA || 0–4 || Sutherlin (4–1) || Haendiges (3–3) || None || 6–7 || 
|-bgcolor=ffbbbb
| Feb 25 || vs. * || || Big League Dreams Complex • Cathedral City, CA || 0–6 || Ruck (1–0) || Stepto (2–3) || None || 6–8 || 
|-bgcolor=bbffbb
| Feb 26 || vs. * || || Big League Dreams Complex • Cathedral City, CA || 2–1 || Stepto (3–3) || Greer (2–1) || None || 7–8 || 
|-

|-bgcolor=bbffbb
| Mar 2 || vs. BYU* || || Karl Brooks Stadium • St. George, UT || 7–4 || Haendiges (4–3) || Temples (2–3) || Garcia (2) || 8–8 || 
|-bgcolor=bbffbb
| Mar 3 || vs. * || || Karl Brooks Stadium • St. George, UT || 3–2 || Garcia (5–3) || Saili (1–3) || None || 9–8 || 
|-bgcolor=ffbbbb
| Mar 3 || at * || || Karl Brooks Stadium • St. George, UT || 0–1 || Garton (5–1) || Stepto (3–4) || None || 9–9 || 
|-bgcolor=ffbbbb
| Mar 4 || vs. * || || Karl Brooks Stadium • St. George, UT || 2–3 || Newman (1–1) || Stepto (3–5) || Schuring (1) || 9–10 || 
|-bgcolor=ffbbbb
| Mar 4 || vs. * || || Karl Brooks Stadium • St. George, UT || 2–5 || Zellien (2–1) || Haendiges (4–4) || None || 9–11 || 
|-bgcolor=ffbbbb
| Mar 10 || at  || || Dumke Family Softball Stadium • Salt Lake City, UT || 1–66 || Sandy (9–1) || Stepto (3–6) || None || 9–12 || 0–1
|-bgcolor=ffbbbb
| Mar 11 || at Utah || || Dumke Family Softball Stadium • Salt Lake City, UT || 6–7 || Lopez (7–2) || Garcia (2–3) || None || 9–13 || 0–2
|-bgcolor=ffbbbb
| Mar 12 || at Utah || || Dumke Family Softball Stadium • Salt Lake City, UT || 5–6 || Sandez (10–1) || Garcia (2–4) || None || 9–14 || 0–3
|-bgcolor=bbffbb
| Mar 17 || vs.  || || Kelly Field • Corvallis, OR || 2–1 || Stepto (4–6) || Reimers (6–2) || None || 10–14 || 1–3
|-bgcolor=ffbbbb
| Mar 18 || vs. California || || Kelly Field • Corvallis, OR || 6–15 || Halajian (3–1) || Moffitt (0–1) || None || 10–15 || 1–4
|-bgcolor=bbbbbb
| Mar 19 || vs. California || || Kelly Field • Corvallis, OR ||  ||  ||  ||  ||  || 
|-bgcolor=bbbbbb
| Mar 24 || at  || || Boyd & Jill Smith Family Stadium  • Stanford, CA ||  ||  ||  ||  ||  || 
|-bgcolor=bbbbbb
| Mar 25 || at Stanford || || Boyd & Jill Smith Family Stadium  • Stanford, CA ||  ||  ||  ||  ||  || 
|-bgcolor=bbbbbb
| Mar 26 || at Stanford || || Boyd & Jill Smith Family Stadium  • Stanford, CA ||  ||  ||  ||  ||  || 
|-bgcolor=bbbbbb
| Mar 31 || vs.  || || Kelly Field • Corvallis, OR ||  ||  ||  ||  ||  || 
|-

|-bgcolor=bbbbbb
| Apr 1 || vs. Oregon || || Kelly Field • Corvallis, OR ||  ||  ||  ||  ||  || 
|-bgcolor=bbbbbb
| Apr 2 || vs. Oregon || || Kelly Field • Corvallis, OR ||  ||  ||  ||  ||  || 
|-bgcolor=bbbbbb
| Apr 6 || at UCLA || || Easton Stadium • Los Angeles, CA ||  ||  ||  ||  ||  || 
|-bgcolor=bbbbbb
| Apr 7 || at UCLA || || Easton Stadium • Los Angeles, CA ||  ||  ||  ||  ||  || 
|-bgcolor=bbbbbb
| Apr 8 || at UCLA || || Easton Stadium • Los Angeles, CA ||  ||  ||  ||  ||  || 
|-bgcolor=bbbbbb
| Apr 14 || vs.  || || Kelly Field • Corvallis, OR ||  ||  ||  ||  ||  || 
|-bgcolor=bbbbbb
| Apr 15 || vs. Washington || || Kelly Field • Corvallis, OR ||  ||  ||  ||  ||  || 
|-bgcolor=bbbbbb
| Apr 16 || vs. Washington || || Kelly Field • Corvallis, OR ||  ||  ||  ||  ||  || 
|-bgcolor=bbbbbb
| Apr 28 || at  || || Mike Candrea Field at Rita Hillenbrand Memorial Stadium • Tucson, AZ ||  ||  ||  ||  ||  || 
|-bgcolor=bbbbbb
| Apr 29 || at Arizona || || Mike Candrea Field at Rita Hillenbrand Memorial Stadium • Tucson, AZ ||  ||  ||  ||  ||  || 
|-bgcolor=bbbbbb
| Apr 30 || at Arizona || || Mike Candrea Field at Rita Hillenbrand Memorial Stadium • Tucson, AZ ||  ||  ||  ||  ||  || 
|-

|-bgcolor=bbbbbb
| May 5 || vs.  || || Kelly Field • Corvallis, OR ||  ||  ||  ||  ||  || 
|-bgcolor=bbbbbb
| May 6 || vs. Arizona State || || Kelly Field • Corvallis, OR ||  ||  ||  ||  ||  || 
|-bgcolor=bbbbbb
| May 7 || vs. Arizona State || || Kelly Field • Corvallis, OR ||  ||  ||  ||  ||  || 
|-

|-
|- style="text-align:center;"
|

Rankings

References

Oregon State
Oregon State Beavers softball
Oregon State Beavers softball seasons